The 2007 Towson Tigers football team represented Towson University in the 2007 NCAA Division I FCS football season. They were led by 16th-year head coach Gordy Combs and played their home games at Johnny Unitas Stadium. They are a member of the Colonial Athletic Association. They finished the season 3–8, 1–7 in CAA play.

Schedule

References

Towson
Towson Tigers football seasons
Towson Tigers football